ODB may refer to:

People
 Ol' Dirty Bastard (1968–2004), American rapper and founding member of the Wu-Tang Clan
 ODB (wrestler) (born 1978), Stage name of American professional wrestler Jessica Kresa
 Original David Baker (born 1972), a moniker of American poker player David Baker

Computers and technology
 .odb file extension for OpenDocument format databases
 Object database
 ODB++, a CAD-to-CAM data exchange format used in the design and manufacture of electronic devices

Publications
 Our Daily Bread (devotional), Christian devotional booklets produced by Our Daily Bread Ministries
 Oxford Dictionary of Byzantium, a three volume historical dictionary published by Oxford University Press

Other uses
 ODB, the IATA airport code of Córdoba Airport